TDC Games is a board game and jigsaw puzzle manufacturer formerly located in Itasca, Illinois. The company creates and sells family games, jigsaw puzzles, board games, and adult-oriented games. The company has merged with Wood Expressions of California, www.woodexpressions.com 

Approximately 4,000 retail stores sell the company's games in the United States, and stores in other countries including United Kingdom, Australia and New Zealand also sell TDC products. The company was run by its two founders, Larry Balsamo and Sandra Bergeson.

History 
TDC was founded in 1984 by Larry Balsamo (former club owner, magician and owner of Hey! Wires Singing Telegrams) and Sandra Schaeffer Bergeson (former soprano with the Lyric Opera of Chicago and the NYC Opera). TDC is a regular exhibitor at Toy Fair in New York City each year, with products distributed internationally.

Games
The first game in the TDC Line was called "Adultrivia."They have since produced such hit games as "Dirty Minds", "The Jerry Springer Game", "NFL Opoly", "Reminiscing", "ManLaws & Woman Rules" and the Campbell's Alphabet Dice Game. Most, but not all, of the games, produced by TDC have been conversation/party games with a hint of adult content. Other more family oriented additions have been titles such as "Chess for Dummies,", "Senior Moments" and "MLB Card Games & Puzzles". In 2011 their title "Campbell's Alphabet Dice Game" won the National Parenting Center Preferred Choice Award and the Tilliwig Best Family Fun Award.

Puzzles
TDC did not enter the puzzle world until the late 1990s, with a series called "The Alphabet Murder Mystery Puzzles". All of the TDC puzzles have some sort of gimmick. For example, "Portable Puzzles" include a puzzle roll-up in each box. "Puzzles for Dummies" have numbered pieces and a grid to help put it all together, while "Visible Puzzles" have big pieces and a magnifying glass for the vision impaired. TDC also added a line of mini jigsaw puzzles w/timy pieces and tweezers to help assemble.
The most memorable puzzle in the TDC line has been "LOST". Based on the incredibly popular hit TV show on ABC, the "LOST" puzzles consist of four 1000 piece puzzles with secret information about the show hidden inside. In 2011, and in keeping with the "gimmicks", TDC added a line of Major League Baseball mini puzzles (which include tweezers) and pennant shaped jigsaw puzzles suitable for framing.

AWARDS
2000 Make Your Own Opoly: Hobby Outlook Educational Item of the Year Award
2007 "Fat Brain Award"
2011 Campbell's Alphabet Dice Game: The National Parenting Center Seal of Approval & The Tilliwig Best Family Fun Award

References 

Companies based in DuPage County, Illinois
Toy companies of the United States
Itasca, Illinois
Jigsaw puzzle manufacturers